Berkeley Square is a 1998 British dramatic television series that was originally broadcast by BBC One. Set in 1902, it focuses on three young women who are employed as nannies by wealthy families living on exclusive Berkeley Square in the West End of London.

It was filmed on location in Chavenage House in Tetbury, Gloucester, Priddy in Somerset, Stanway House in Stanway, Gloucestershire, and Bristol.

Cast

The Lamson-Scribener household
Tabitha Wady as Lydia Weston
Rosemary Leach as Nanny Collins
Rupert Frazer as Lord George Lamson-Scribener 
Briony Glassco as Lady Constance Lamson-Scribener 
Nicholas Irons as Lord Hugh Lamson-Scribener
Peter Forbes as Fowler

The Hutchinson household
Victoria Smurfit as Hannah Randall
Sophie Walker as Isabel Hutchinson 
Rosalind Knight as Great-Aunt Effie
Ruth Sheen as Nanny Simmons
Adam Hayes as Bertie Hutchinson

The St. John household
Clare Wilkie as Matty Wickham    
Jason O'Mara as Ned Jones
Hermione Norris as Victoria St. John
Sean Murray as Arnold St. John
Kate Williams as Mrs. McClusky
Maggie McCarthy as Cook
Amy Hodge as Pringle

And
Etela Pardo as Mrs. Bronowski
William Scott-Masson as Captain Mason
Stuart Laing as Jack Wickham

Episodes

The final episode had a cliffhanger ending with many plot lines unresolved; however, a second series was not produced.

Home media 
The DVD of this series is available now, distributed by Acorn Media UK.

External links
 
Images from the series

BBC television dramas
Fiction set in 1902
Television shows set in London
1998 British television series debuts
1998 British television series endings
1990s British drama television series
1990s British television miniseries
English-language television shows